Anouschka Popp (born 19 July 1972) is a German former professional tennis player.

Popp, who grew up around Frankfurt, reached a best singles ranking of 164 competing on the professional tour. She won a $25k title in Erlangen in 1990 and the following year featured in the main draw of two WTA Tour tournaments, the Croatian Bol Ladies Open and German Open.

Finishing up on tour in 1992, Popp went on to play college tennis for the University of Florida in 1994.

ITF finals

Singles (1–0)

Doubles (1–2)

References

External links
 
 

1972 births
Living people
West German female tennis players
German female tennis players
Tennis players from Frankfurt
Florida Gators women's tennis players